Vladimir Ivanovich Akimov(20 July 1953 – 5 October 1987), was a Soviet water polo player  who won a gold medal in the 1980 Summer Olympics in Moscow.

Akimov had one sister Tatiana and three brothers, Victor, Nikolay, and Anatoly. All brothers were national water polo players, and Anatoly also won an Olympic gold medal.

Akimov was married and had a son Roman. In 1987 he was assaulted and died of a head injury.

See also
 Soviet Union men's Olympic water polo team records and statistics
 List of Olympic champions in men's water polo
 List of Olympic medalists in water polo (men)
 List of world champions in men's water polo
 List of World Aquatics Championships medalists in water polo

References

External links
 

Olympic water polo players of the Soviet Union
Water polo players at the 1980 Summer Olympics
Olympic gold medalists for the Soviet Union
Olympic medalists in water polo
1953 births
Medalists at the 1980 Summer Olympics
Russian male water polo players
Soviet male water polo players
1987 deaths